The 2005 Asian Wrestling Championships were held in Wuhan, China. The event took place from May 24 to May 29, 2005.

Medal table

Team ranking

Medal summary

Men's freestyle

Men's Greco-Roman

Women's freestyle

Participating nations 
215 competitors from 19 nations competed.

 (2)
 (21)
 (11)
 (21)
 (6)
 (14)
 (9)
 (21)
 (17)
 (15)
 (14)
 (8)
 (2)
 (5)
 (21)
 (2)
 (2)
 (12)
 (12)

References
Results

External links
UWW Database

Asia
W
Asian Wrestling Championships
International wrestling competitions hosted by China